COUP transcription factor may refer to:

 COUP-TFI, a protein that in humans is encoded by the NR2F1 gene
 COUP-TFII, a protein that in humans is encoded by the NR2F2 gene

Transcription factors